Jackie Vernon (born Ralph Verrone; March 29, 1924 – November 10, 1987) was an American stand-up comedian and actor, who was best known for his role as the voice of Frosty the Snowman in the Rankin/Bass Productions Christmas special Frosty the Snowman and its sequel Frosty's Winter Wonderland.

Early life
Jackie Vernon was born Ralph Verrone on March 29, 1924, in New York City. After attending and graduating from high school, he attended City College before enlisting and serving in the U.S. Air Force. He began his career in 1955 with performing stand-up comedy in various small nightclubs and hotel lounges around the country from New York, to Chicago, to Miami and Los Angeles.

Career
Vernon was known for his gentle, low-key delivery and self-deprecating humor. He has been hailed as "The King of Deadpan." His signature opening line was, "To look at me now, it's hard to believe I was once considered a dull guy."

Early in the 1950s, according to Dick Brooks, Vernon bounced around the country working whatever stand-up comedy jobs he could find, mostly in strip joints and hotel lounges. Even then he had a unique style, often cracking up members of the audience with his inside humor. He decided to give New York City a try, and he was often seen hanging around Hanson's Drug Store, a place where small-time comedians and acts in the theater section of New York would meet after making the rounds of agents who had their offices in the area. He was picked up by manager of comedian Willie Weber. In 1963, Vernon was noticed while performing stand-up at a local nightclub in Windsor, Ontario, Canada where Steve Allen was in attendance and he invited Vernon to appear on his late-night television show, Celebrity Talent Scouts, and after that, Vernon's career finally took off.

During the 1960s, Vernon occasionally worked as the opening act for both Dean Martin and Judy Garland and was a regular fixture on The Merv Griffin Show, where he informed the host that his original stage name had been "Nosmo King," which he had seen on a sign (i.e. "no smoking"). He would take up a topic like prisons in a monologue and begin with, "Hello, prison fans." 

Vernon was also known to perform unique and darker sketches, such as his ultimately tragic attempt to turn a watermelon into a house pet. Plagued by strange occurrences and misfortune, Jackie would tell of traveling all the way to see the Grand Canyon, only to find it was closed. He also told of the time he went to see a fistfight, and it broke out into a hockey game. 

One of his early bits was the "Vacation Slide Show." There were no slides visible; they were presumably off-screen as he described them, using a hand-clicker to advance to each "slide":
(click) Here I am, tossing coins at the toll booth.
(click) Here I am, under the car, looking for the coins.
(click) Here I am, picking up a hitchhiker.
(click) Here is the hitchhiker holding me up.
(click) Here I am, hitchhiking.
(click) Here's the hitchhiker picking me up with my own car. Luckily, she didn't recognize me.

A typical joke of Vernon's: "We lived in a small town built on a one-way street. If you miss it you have to drive all the way around the world to get back."

Vernon was once a trumpet player and often carried a cornet with him as a prop during his stand-up routines. As with Henny Youngman and his violin, it was seldom actually played. When he guested on a summer variety program hosted by Al Hirt in 1965, he came on with his cornet and said, "I play like I'm Hirt." He was a popular figure on The Ed Sullivan Show and other variety shows, where he often ended his act by blowing a cornet and saying, "I think I hurt myself!" 

He often appeared on the Dean Martin Celebrity Roasts that were a staple of 1970s television, as well as being a fixture on the dais at the original live Friars Club Roasts before and after the televised versions. Vernon's signature deadpan expression and delivery often had the roast audiences laughing hysterically, long before the punch line of the jokes. On December 6, 1972, one of Vernon's recorded concerts was released which was titled Sex Is Not Hazardous To Your Health, a record album recording of his first stand-up routine of sex jokes. Vernon's X-rated story-style jokes about people engaging in extreme sexual depravity became legend, often with the added tag line, "and I thought to myself... what a neat guy!" 

Vernon also memorably starred in Wayne Berwick's 1979 cult film Microwave Massacre, in which he plays a lascivious construction builder who kills his wife for bossing him around and making him too many microwaved "gourmet" meals.

Charlie Chaplin
Vernon said that for the first few years after starting standup in the 1950s, he would write letters to his hero Charlie Chaplin, although he never got a reply or any acknowledgement of his letter-writing. After Vernon became famous and was making TV appearances, he eventually stopped writing to Chaplin. During an appearance in Las Vegas, the hotel management told him that Charlie Chaplin would be in the audience that night; Jackie asked if he could meet Chaplin. He was told that Chaplin was eating dinner right then in the restaurant. Vernon walked up to Chaplin's table, and as he started to introduce himself, Chaplin interrupted him, saying, "Of course, Jackie Vernon. Tell me: why did you stop writing?"

Frosty the Snowman
Despite his reputation as a raunchy comedian, Vernon also supplied the voice of the title character of the popular family friendly Rankin-Bass television special Frosty the Snowman (1969), which has been broadcast annually on CBS since its debut. He later reprised the voice in two more Rankin-Bass specials: Frosty's Winter Wonderland (1976) and Rudolph and Frosty's Christmas in July (1979).

Personal life
Vernon was married to Hazel Sawyer. They had three children; David, Lisa, and Tracey.

Death
Vernon died at his home in Hollywood, California, on November 10, 1987, from a heart attack at age 63.

Vernon's wife, Hazel, died on March 21, 2006, at the age of 77.

Discography
 A Wet Bird Never Flies at Night (Jubilee  JGM 2052, 1964)
 A Man and his Watermelon (United Artists UAL 3577, 1967)
 The Day My Rocking Horse Died (United Artists UAS 6679, 1969)
 Sex Is Not Hazardous to Your Health (Beverly Hills  BH 1133, 1972)

Filmography
That's Life (1968–1969)
The Monitors (1969) - Jackie Vernon
Frosty the Snowman (1969) - Frosty (voice)
The Dean Martin Show (1970)
Night Gallery (1971) - Chatterje
The Gang That Couldn't Shoot Straight (1971) - Herman
A Touch of Grace (1973) - Bartender
Kolchak: The Night Stalker (1975) - Coach Toomey
Frosty's Winter Wonderland (1976) - Frosty (voice)
CHiPs (1977–1979) - Park Employee, Bert
Rudolph and Frosty's Christmas in July (1979) - Frosty (voice)
Microwave Massacre (1979) - Donald
Mafia on the Bounty (1980) - Capuzzi
The Woman Inside (1981) - Support Group Leader
Amazon Women on the Moon (1987) - Roast Participant
Faerie Tale Theatre (1986) - Phlegmatic Jack (episode: "The Princess Who Had Never Laughed")

References

External links

A routine from 1967

1924 births
1987 deaths
American people of Italian descent
Male actors from New York City
American male comedians
American male voice actors
20th-century American male actors
Comedians from New York City
20th-century American comedians